McCune Run is a  long 3rd order tributary to French Creek in Venango County, Pennsylvania.

Course
McCune Run rises on the Powdermill Creek divide about 1.5 miles south of Deckard, Pennsylvania in Venango County.  McCune Run then flows southerly through Venango County to meet French Creek about 2 miles northwest of Utica, Pennsylvania.

Watershed
McCune Run drains  of area, receives about 43.7 in/year of precipitation, has a topographic wetness index of 409.28, and has an average water temperature of 8.25 °C.  The watershed is 63% forested.

See also 
 List of rivers of Pennsylvania
 List of tributaries of the Allegheny River

References

Additional Images

Rivers of Mercer County, Pennsylvania
Rivers of Venango County, Pennsylvania
Rivers of Pennsylvania
Tributaries of the Allegheny River